Robert Lee Greene, Jr. (born July 2, 1970), better known by his stage name Spice 1 (an acronym for "Sex, Pistols, Indo, Cash and Entertainment"), is an American rapper from Hayward, California. He began releasing albums in 1992, where he gained popularity as a pioneer of the Oakland-San Francisco Bay Area hip-hop scene.

Career

Jive Records (1991 – 1999)
In 1991, he released his first EP, Let It Be Known. In 1992, he released Spice 1, and in 1993 released 187 He Wrote.

Spice 1 released six albums under Jive Records along with one greatest hits album. Three of them, Spice 1, 187 He Wrote and AmeriKKKa's Nightmare, were certified gold.

Personal life
Greene attended Mt. Eden High School in Hayward. In an interview, Greene stated he once stole a car that resembled one owned by Too Short and used it to make "doughnuts" (doughnut shaped tire burns) on the street outside of Too Short's mother's house, in an attempt to impress the older rapper.

When Greene received his first large check for his music, he stopped selling drugs and focused on making music instead.

In a recording session on September 7, 1996, Greene, Tupac Shakur, and Kokane recorded the song "Fame" together, which is believed to be the last song that Shakur ever recorded before he was shot in Las Vegas later that same night. Greene, being a close personal friend of the late rapper, was on his way to meet up with him in Las Vegas for an after party when he received news about Shakur's shooting.

On December 3, 2007, Greene was shot while sitting in his car outside his parents' home in Oakland, California. He survived the shooting and later recovered at a hospital.

Discography

Studio albums
Spice 1 (1992)
187 He Wrote (1993)
AmeriKKKa's Nightmare (1994)
1990-Sick (1995)
The Black Bossalini (1997)
Immortalized (1999)
The Last Dance (2000)
Spiceberg Slim (2002)
The Ridah (2004)
Dyin' 2 Ball (2005)
The Truth (2005)
Haterz Nightmare (2015)
Throne of Game (2017)
Platinum O.G. (2019)
This Is Thug World, Vol. 1 (2020)

Collaboration albums
Criminal Activity with Criminalz (2001)
NTA: National Thug Association with Bad Boy (2003)
The Pioneers with MC Eiht (2004)
Thug Lordz Trilogy with Thug Lordz (2006)
Keep It Gangsta with MC Eiht (2006)
Criminal Intent with Jayo Felony (2007)
Thug Therapy with Bossolo (2015)

References

External links
Spice 1 on Facebook

Living people
African-American male rappers
American shooting survivors
People from Navarro County, Texas
People from Hayward, California
Rappers from Texas
Rappers from the San Francisco Bay Area
1970 births
West Coast hip hop musicians
Gangsta rappers
21st-century American rappers
21st-century American male musicians
People from Salida, California
21st-century African-American musicians
20th-century African-American people